Mathews Mar Athanasius (Mar Thoma XIII) (25 April 1818 – 16 July 1877) was the Malankara Metropolitan of the Malankara Church from 1852 until 1865. As a reformer, he spent most of his reign attempting to reform and heal rifts within the church. However in 1865, he was deposed by the traditionalist faction of the Malankara Church and Pulikkottil Joseph Dionysius became their leader.

Mathews started his career in the church in childhood, and was influenced by the Church Mission Society and his uncle Abraham Malpan, a priest who instituted reforms in Maramon parish in 1840. When Abraham's reforms led to conflict with the reigning Malankara Metropolitan   Dionysius IV, Deacon Mathews traveled to the Syriac Orthodox Patriarch, who consecrated him  as Bishop Mathews Athanasius in 1841. After years of dispute over the church's leadership between Mathews and Dionysius, the issue was settled by the Travancore government in 1852, with Mathews being recognized as Metropolitan since he got the Royal decree from the Maharaja of Travancore. He worked to repair the rift in the church, but continuing unrest ultimately led to a permanent split. After the Synod of Mulanthurathy and the death of Athanasious the rift in Malankara Church became more visible. Following the Royal Court Verdict against Metropolitan Thomas Athanasius and the reform party, the independent Malankara Mar Thoma Syrian Church was formed in 1889 as the Independent Malankara Syrian Church.

Early life

Pakalomattom Palakunnathu family
In the 17th century, a member of the Panamkuzhy family came and settled in Kozhencherry on the banks of river Pampa. Later they moved to Maramon, and lived at Chackkalyil, on the other side of the river. The second son in that family, Mathen moved to a nearby house at Palakunnathu. He had six sons and a daughter. The daughter was married to Pavoothikunnel family and the first four sons moved to Themoottil, Neduvelil, Periyilel, and Punamadom. The fifth son was a hermit priest (sanyasi achen). As was the custom, the youngest son Mathew lived at Palakunnathu family house (this house still exists).
Being members of the ancient Malankara Church, many leaders were born in this family. Leader of the reformation in Malankara Church, Abraham Malpan, Mathews Mar Athanasius Metropolitan (Thoma XIII); Thomas Mar Athanasius Metropolitan (Thoma XIV); Titus I Mar Thoma Metropolitan (Thoma XV); Titus II Mar Thoma Metropolitan (Thoma XVI); Dr. Joseph Mar Thoma Metropolitan (Thoma XXI), were also from this family.

Parents
Mathen (മാത്തൻ), the eldest son of Palakunnathu Mathew and Maraimma, was born on 25 April 1818. After 90 days he was baptized at the Maramon palli (church).

Education
Early education was at Maramon and his teacher was the poet laureate Chekottassan. At the age of eleven, he joined the Syrian Seminary at Kottayam. When he was thirteen, he was ordained as a deacon by Thoma XII. (Cheppattu Dionysius). After completing his education in Kerala, Deacon Mathen joined Rev. John Anderson's School (now known as Madras Christian College), at Chennai. His friend Deacon George Mathen also joined him. By 1839, they had completed their education in Madras and returned home.

Future plan
At that time condition of Malankara Church was in disarray and at times deplorable.

Before leaving Madras, the two friends, Deacon Mathen and Deacon George Mathen would often spend time together talking about their future plans. Both of them being deacons, and by scholarly insight, felt the condition of the Malankara Church to be deplorable. Saying, "It is impossible to restore the Malankara Church," Deacon George decided to join the Anglican C.M.S. Church. But for Deacon Mathen it was about being faithful to his family's cause and that of Abraham Malpan. It is said that, in the pride of youth, he often said, "As long as I am alive, I shall work only in my mother Church (Malankara Church) and will live to pull out the weeds in my Church and bring it back to its original glory of pure undiluted faith."

Beginning of reformation

By this time, Deacon Mathen's uncle (father's brother) Abraham Malpan had already begun reformation in the church and made the following changes:
On Sunday 27 August 1837, Qurbana (Holy Communion) was conducted in Malayalam, the language of the people.
Every year on 5 October, there was a church festival at Maramon, connected with a saint (Eldho Mor Baselios) of the church. A wooden image of Muthappan(Muthappan meaning elder was a term that the Nasrani community used for Bishops, in this case the Maphrian, Saint Eldho Mar Baselios) was taken around in procession; people would offer prayers and offerings to it. In 1837, 22 years after his ordination of the parish, Abraham Malpan took the image and threw it into a well saying, "Why consult the dead on behalf of the living?". Thus the prayers to the saints and prayers for the dead were removed from the reformed liturgy 
Changes were made to certain prayers in the prayer books, incorporating reformation theologies and insights received through the study of the Holy Bible.

The use of the revised liturgy and the changes Abraham Malpan brought about in practices offended Cheppad Philipose Dionysius, who threatened him with excommunication. But Abraham Malpan informed him that if excommunicated, he would not come begging to revoke it. Thoma XII did not terminate or laicize him, allowed to keep the vicar position, then suspended Malpan from religious duties; he also refused the priesthood to the deacons trained under Malpan because of his divergent teachings.

Decision to go to Antioch
It was at this time Deacon Mathen returned from Madras. He realized the problems that faced him, his friends, his uncle Abraham Malpan, and the clergy who wanted a reformation in the Church. Deacon Mathen stood with his decision, "I shall live to pull out the weeds in my Church and bring it back to its original glory of pure undiluted faith."

The synod convened by the Dionysius at Mavelikkara on 16 January 1836 accepted the supremacy of the Syriac Orthodox Church of Antioch. They also stated that only bishops permitted by the Patriarch had authority over the Church. This led Deacon Mathen to the conviction that he must visit the Patriarch of the Bishopric without permission. Abraham Malpan was willing to sacrifice anything for a new order in the Church (in particular, the most profound sacrifice was hiding the truth of the intention for a reformation from the Patriarch - the shock of the Syriac Orthodox church at being deceived and cheated is apparent from the content of their subsequent appeals to the British crown for the preservation of the Orthodox faith of the Malankara church from Mar Athanasius' plans of Anglican modeled reform); he prepared letters, spurred on by his determination Because of the difficulties of traveling from Kerala to Antioch, no one from the Malankara Church had ever attempted to go to Antioch before. Deacon Mathen was the first one to attempt this tedious journey (and he was given assistance for this by British Anglicans in Madras).

Metropolitan
Deacon Mathen was ordained, by Moran Mor Elias II, Patriarch under the Episcopal title, Mathews Athanasius Metropolitan, at Mardin on 17 February 1842 only because he believed that he held the same Orthodox faith since it would be impossible to ordain him otherwise. He was appointed as the Metropolitan of Mosul and was given charge of the diocese. He continued on as Orthodox in practice.

Back in Kerala
Mathews Athanasius Metropolitan returned to Kerala on 17 May 1843 and was received by a number of parish priests and laymen. While he was at Cochin, his teacher, Konattu Varghese Malpan, arrived there with his followers. He advised the Metropolitan that the people of Malankara Church would accept him as their Metropolitan, and if he began reformation, the people would not follow. He realized that he could not make reforms easily.

Meeting with Swathi Thirunal Maharaja
Soon after his return to Kerala, he paid a visit to the then ruling Maharaja (king) of Travancore, Swathi Thirunal. Both of them were fluent in Malayalam, English, and Arabic, and their conversations were extended to happenings in western Asia through these languages.

Reformation
The Malankara Church was following the teachings of Jesus as told to them by St. Thomas & St. Bartholomew and had copies of the original Peshittha Bible and were following the practices of the East Syriac church which was founded by St. Thomas and his disciples. St. Addai and St. Mari, and which practiced prayers to and for the dead, veneration of icons, believed in the seven sacraments and the real presence of Christ in the Eucharist. But things changed with the arrival of Vasco Da Gama on Sunday 20 May 1498. The teachings of the Roman Catholic Church were inculcated into the original teachings: prayers to and for the dead, Veneration of icons, Celibacy of priests, and so on with only Celibacy of priests being something new and even the Roman Catholics had adopted it late. Many other practices of the Malankara Church become deplorable in his view. So he and his friends stood at the helm of a reformation movement that was already there in the church pioneered by Abraham Malpan, a practice of bringing the church to its radix form as Bible Principles.

His whole time he spent in bringing his Church to the Bible and to its "original purity" as evoked by Abraham Malpan.

In 1856 inspired by the Anglican missionaries cooperated in the Old Syrian Seminary at Kottayam, he printed and distributed prayer books in Malayalam, leaving out a prayer to Saint Mary.

Holy Communion services were conducted in Malayalam the language of the people of Malabar, abandoning Syriac Aramaic the language of the Peshitta, and the linguistic link that both West Syriac and East Syriac churches had to the Aramaic speaking Jesus Christ.
While with the Patriarch at Antioch, he was asked to preach at worship services. He continued this new practice after coming to Kerala. He encouraged clergy to read the Bible and interpret it to the common people of parishes.

Allowed Tamil missionaries to preach at various churches.

He was against honoring icons and statues, so he removed the statue of Saint Mary from Manarcaud Church (near Kottayam), and at Puthupally church, near Kottayam.

Social reforms
Athanasius was a social reformer also. He did a lot of things to help to improve the conditions of society. Some of the schools were run by the Malankara Church. Athanasius advised the government to give some of the grant to the schools as an encouragement. Government approved this proposal and gave grants to more than sixty schools. Without the difference in caste, creed or color people approached Athanasius with their grievances for help from him. Christians were forced to work on Sundays and do menial work in Hindu temples at other times. Punishments were severe if they disobeyed. Athanasius put an end to all these. His friendship with the Maharajas, government, and its officials were of great help in this area.

Oppositions
Athanasius went to the Patriarch of Antioch without the permission of Dionysius IV. He was educated in a school run by British missionaries. His uncle Abraham Malpan was the leader of the reformation. Because of all these, though he returned as a Metropolitan, there were objections from among the Malankara Church. They later wrote to Antioch their objections, and as a result, the Patriarch realizing that Mathews Mar Athanasius had hidden his intentions to conduct an Anglican modeled reformation from him, so the patriarch sent Euyakim Coorilos Metropolitan to Kerala, and from then on the Syriac Orthodox Church of Antioch introduced the "registered deed of submission" as an element of consecration as a metropolitan bishop.

Royal proclamation
In 1852,  Cheppattu Philipose Dionysius' deteriorating health led to abdication. During the days of Thoma VII (1808–1809), a sum of 3000-star pagoda (Poovarahan) was given by Col.Macaulay as an investment in perpetuity by East India Company for support of church activities; Value of one-star pagoda coin is equivalent to 3.50 INR in the current currency system. Forgiving the interest for this amount known as Vattipanam then, the government had to find out who the head was.

Athanasius was approved by the governments of Travancore and Cochin as Malankara Metropolitan on 30 August 1852. after Cheppattu Philipose Dionysius abdicated due to ill health. Because of this, he was able to collect the interest of Vattipanam for the past 45 years, from the government. This did not please some of the members of the Church.

Consecration at Thozhyoor
In 1856, Athanasius ordained Ouseph Coorilose as Metropolitan of Malabar Independent Syrian Church.

Parishes
Athanasius used to visit parishes stayed there for a few days and meet the people of the parish. During that period, he appointed officers to conduct financial matters efficiently. Some members did not like this.

Publications
Athanasius established a printing press at Kottayam for the use of the Church. There, the liturgy was printed and published, omitting the prayers to Saint Mary and other saints. This infuriated a few priests. Those who opposed the Metropolitan published another book with all these prayers included.

Arrival of Patriarch
During his time, reformation of the Church gained momentum. Ouseph Kathanar from Kunnamkulam, who objected to reformation, went to Antioch and was consecrated as Joseph Dionysius on 3 April 1865. After his return, those who opposed Mathews Athanasius invited the Patriarch of Antioch. The large majority of the people were conservative, and the reformist party was a very small minority. Thus a large majority joined the Patriarch of Antioch.

Ignatius Pathrose III, Patriarch of Antioch arrived in June 1875 at Kunnamkulam. On his way, he visited Istanbul, London, and Madras. By this time, those who opposed Mathews Athanasius had a rumor flying among them that Athanasius would be laicized or excommunicated, without realizing that this was not possible. There are no records discovered yet to show that Mathews Athanasius was ever excommunicated. Although there have been rumors that Abraham Malpan and Mathews Athanasius weren't in agreement on reformation, Malpan sought for restoration through puritanism based on Anglican-Protestantism, while Mathews Athanasius sought for separation and autonomy.

Ordinations
Athanasius ordained
 Maramon Palakunnathu Thomas Kassessa under the name Thomas Athanasius as his successor on 1 June 1868.
 Aarthatt Alathoor Ouseph Kathanar under the name Joseph Coorilos of Malabar Independent Syrian Church in 1856.
 Gheevarghese of Mulanthuruthy Chathuruthy family was ordained as Korooyo (sub-deacon) on 14 September 1858, at Karingachira (was reordained in 1864). Later he became Gheevarghese Gregorios of Parumala, he died on 2 November 1902 and was laid to rest at Parumala Church. Later he became a canonized saint of the Malankara Church and is also known in Malayalam as Parumala Thirumeni.

Relation with other Metropolitans
 Cheppad Philipose Dionysius was seriously ill and was living at Cheppad. He had no one to care for him. Athanasius went to Cheppad made arrangements to care for him and visited the parishes nearby till he died on 9 October 1855. The funeral service was conducted by Athanasius.
Coorilos became sick and was at Mulanthuruthy church. He visited him and comforted him. Coorilos died on 2 September 1874.

Death and Succession

Metropolitan died on 16 July 1877, after being bitten by a rat on 16 July 1877, and was laid to rest at Maramon Palli (church).

The reformist faction was led by Thomas Athanasius. Mathews Mar Athanasius remained as the head of this faction until his death in 1877

The traditionalist party sent Fr.Joseph (Ouseph Kathanar) of Pulikkottil family to Antioch. He was the nephew of Pulikkottil Joseph Mar Dionysious I (Mar Dionysius II). He was consecrated as Joseph Mar Dionysius II (Mar Dionysius V) by Patriarch of Antioch Ignatius Jacob II on 7 May 1865. After reaching Malankara, Mar Dionysius V had requested to the Government of Travancore, for revoking the Royal Proclamation, issued earlier in favour of Mathews Mar Athanasius. Soon after the demise of Mathews Athanasius Metropolitan the Malankara Church was involved in litigation for the properties of the Church in Kerala between the two factions of the church, culminating in the Royal court verdict of 12 July 1889, which was in favor of the traditionalist faction.

References

Further reading
In English
Juhanon Marthoma Metropolitan, The Most Rev. Dr. (1952). Christianity in India and a Brief History of the Marthoma Syrian Church. Pub: K. M. Cherian.
Mathew N. M. (2003). St. Thomas Christians of Malabar Through Ages, C.S.S. Tiruvalla.  and CN 80303.
Zac Varghese Dr. & Mathew A. Kallumpram. (2003). Glimpses of Mar Thoma Church History. London, England. .

In Malayalam
Chacko, T. C. (1936) Malankara Marthoma Sabha Charithra Samgraham (Concise History of Marthoma Church). Pub: E.J. Institute, Kompady, Tiruvalla.
Eapen, Prof. Dr. K. V. (2001). Malankara Marthoma Suryani Sabha Charitram (History of Malankara Marthoma Syrian Church). Pub: Kallettu, Muttambalam, Kottayam.
Ittoop Writer (1906). Malayalathulla Suryani Chistianikauleday Charitram (History of Syrian Christians in the land of Malayalam).
Mathews Mar Athanasius Metropolitan. (1857). Mar Thoma Sleehayude Idavakayakunna Malankara Suryani Sabhaudai Canon. (Canon of the Malankara Syrian Church of Saint Thomas). Printed at Kottayam Syrian Seminary.
Mathew, N. M. Malankara Marthoma Sabha Charitram (History of the Marthoma Church), Volume 1 (2006), Volume II (2007), Volume III (2008). Pub. E.J. Institute, Tiruvalla.
 Varkey, M. P. (1901) Malankara Idavakayude Mar Dionysius Metropolitan (Biography of Mar Dionysius Metropolitan).
Varughese, Rev. K. C. (1972). Malabar Swathanthra Suryani Sabhyude Charitram (History of the Malankar Independednt Suryani Church).

External links
 http://marthomasyrianchurch.org.
 https://web.archive.org/web/20130506055008/http://marthomachurch.in/
 http://www.kuwaitmarthoma.com/e-library.

1818 births
1877 deaths
Christian clergy from Kerala
Oriental Orthodoxy in India
Metropolitans of the Mar Thoma Syrian Church
Pakalomattam family
People from Pathanamthitta district